There are two Grammy Awards given to Producers of the Year:

Grammy Award for Producer of the Year, Non-Classical
Grammy Award for Producer of the Year, Classical